Ngalum is the most populous of the Ok languages of Western New Guinea and Papua New Guinea.

Phonology

Consonants 

 /k/ can also be heard as [ɡ] in word-medial position.

Vowels

References

Languages of Sandaun Province
Languages of western New Guinea
Ok languages